The Cannon 102/35 Model 1914 was a naval gun of the Royal Italian Navy in World War I and World War II, which was modified for shore based anti-aircraft, field artillery, railway gun and coastal artillery roles.

History
The Cannon 102/35 Model 1914 was a licensed variant of a British QF 4-inch naval gun Mk V.  These guns had hand elevation and traverse, had either vertical or horizontal semi-automatic sliding breech block mechanisms and used fixed quick fire ammunition. The naval version was produced in four different models, manufactured by Ansaldo or Vickers and was mounted on three different types of mount.

102/35 variants:
 Schneider Model 1914 - Single pedestal mount, left hand traverse & elevation and semi-automatic breech.
 Schneider-Ansaldo Model 1914 - Single pedestal mount, right hand traverse & elevation and semi-automatic breech.
 Schneider-Ansaldo-Vickers Model 1914-1915 -  Single mount, center pivot, semi-automatic breech, with elevation increased to 80°.
 Vickers-Terni Model 1915 - Dual-purpose, single mount, with semi-automatic breech.

Naval use 
The 102/35 armed many classes of destroyers of the Royal Italian Navy produced during and immediately after World War I, as well as some classes of submarine.  As early as World War I the Cannon 102/35 was in the process of being replaced by the 102/45 or the later 120/45.  However the 102/35 stayed on in a number of different roles in navy and army service until World War II.

Ship classes that carried the 102/35 include:

World War I – land use
Before Italy’s entry into World War I in 1915, Ansaldo offered to provide the Royal Italian Army with forty seven 102/35 guns originally earmarked for installation on destroyers.  These were fitted with large shields and mounted on SPA 9000 truck chassis and were known as 102/35 on SPA 9000.  The Army urgently needed mobile heavy field artillery and these were the first truck-mounted field artillery of the Italian Army.  The total number of guns produced was 99–105 and these armed sixteen mobile batteries during World War I.  These proved effective in operations against Austro-Hungarian forces, however in 1919 the guns were removed from the trucks and are believed to have been returned to the navy.

World War II – land use 
When Italy entered World War II in 1940 it was estimated that one hundred ten 102/35 guns were still in service.  Six were mounted on a navy armored train, which had two carriages each armed with three guns.  While others were mounted on anti-aircraft mounts or used as coastal artillery. In 1941 the Fiat plant in Tripoli mounted seven on trucks and were referred to as 102/35 su Fiat 634N. The guns came from defenses around Tripoli and these established the 1st and 6th mobile batteries, manned by men of the Maritime Militia Artillery.  The 102/35 guns were used as anti-aircraft guns, anti-tank guns and as field-artillery.  The 1st mobile battery was assigned to the 132nd Armoured Division Ariete, while the 6th mobile battery was assigned to the 102nd Motorised Division Trento.

A few guns were also used by Romania, forming an anti-aircraft battery near the port of Constanța. The battery took part in the Raid on Constanța, the main naval battle in the Black Sea during the War, managing to shoot down six Soviet aircraft.

Photo gallery

Notes

Bibliography 
 
 
 
 http://www.navweaps.com/Weapons/WNIT_4-35_m1914.php
 

100 mm artillery
World War I naval weapons
World War II naval weapons
World War I artillery of Italy
World War II artillery of Italy
Naval guns of Italy
World War II anti-aircraft guns